Musa al-Hulah ( also spelled as Mousa al-Houla) is a Syrian village located in the Hirbnafsah Subdistrict of the Hama District, located 30 kilometers southwest of Hama. According to the Syria Central Bureau of Statistics (CBS), Musa al-Hulah had a population of 1,781 in the 2004 census. A municipality was established to administer the village and nearby Jadrin in 2004, after the two villages were separated from the Talaf municipality.

References 

Populated places in Hama District